= SSPG =

SSPG may refer to:

- Steady-state plasma glucose level, a measure to evaluate if subjects under a modified insulin suppression test are considered to be insulin-resistant.
- Swiss School of Public Governance, a center of teaching and research at the ETH Zurich.
